is a Japanese actress and singer. She was a member of the J-pop group Ribbon.  Mark Schilling of The Japan Times described her as "the best comic actress working in Japan today".

Career
Nagasaku appeared in Kiyoshi Kurosawa's 2003 film Doppelganger.

She played a supporting role in the 2007 film Funuke Show Some Love, You Losers!, for which she won the awards for Best Supporting Actress at the 32nd Hochi Film Awards and the Kinema Junpo magazine.

She won the Best Supporting Actress award for Rebirth at the 35th Japan Academy Prize in 2012.

Filmography

Film
 Doppelganger (2003)
 Hanging Garden (2005)
 Su-ki-da (2005)
 Funuke Show Some Love, You Losers! (2007)
 Dolphin Blue (2007)
 Closed Note (2007)
 Sex Is No Laughing Matter (2007)
 Dosokai (2008)
 R246 Story (2008)
 The Clone Returns Home (2009)
 Cast Me If You Can (2010), Aya
 Rebirth (2011), Kiwako Nonomiya
 Solomon's Perjury (2015)
 The Furthest End Awaits (2015), Misaki Yoshida
 True Mothers (2020), Satoko Kurihara

Television
 Kōmyō ga Tsuji (2006), Yodo-dono
 Magerarenai Onna (2010)
 Dirty Mama! (2012)
 Chinmoku Hōtei (2017)
 Mikazuki (2019), Chiaki Akasaka
 Maiagare! (2022–23), Megumi Iwakura
 Modern Love Tokyo (2022)

Dubbing
 Where the Wild Things Are, K.W. (Lauren Ambrose)

Discography

Albums
 N (1993)
 Here and Now (1994)

Singles
 "My Home Town" (1993)
 "Without You" (1994)
 "Ai ni Kite" (1994)
 "9:01 pm" (1998)

References

External links
 Official website
 

Japanese actresses
Japanese women pop singers
Japanese idols
1970 births
Living people
Actors from Ibaraki Prefecture
Musicians from Ibaraki Prefecture
21st-century Japanese singers
21st-century Japanese women singers